Tikhov may refer to:

 Gavriil Adrianovich Tikhov (1875–1960), Belarusian astronomer, and several objects names for him:
 2251 Tikhov, a main-belt asteroid
 Tikhov (lunar crater)
 Tikhov (Martian crater)